Viburnum ellipticum, the common viburnum or oval-leaved viburnum, is a species of shrub in family Adoxaceae. It is native to the western United States from Washington to central California, where it occurs in forests and mountain chaparral habitat. The shrub has deciduous leaves with oval or rounded blades 2 to 6 centimeters long. The leaf blade usually has three main longitudinal veins and a shallowly toothed edge. The inflorescence is a flat-topped cyme of many white flowers each 6 to 8 millimeters wide with five whiskery white stamens. The fruit is a drupe about a centimeter long.

References

External links
Jepson Manual Treatment
Photo gallery

ellipticum
Flora of California
Flora of Oregon
Flora of Washington (state)
Flora without expected TNC conservation status